This is a list of notable people who are ethnically Albanian currently living in Scandinavia.

Politics
Arba Kokalari -  Swedish politician for the Moderate Party

Cinema
Fortesa Hoti -  Swedish actress
René Redzepi -   Danish chef and co-owner of the two-Michelin star restaurant Noma in the Christianshavn

Arts and Entertainment
Dafina Zeqiri -  Albanian-Swedish singer and songwriter
Adrijana Krasniqi -  Swedish singer, songwriter, and rapper
Jimilian -  Danish singer
Misse Beqiri -  Swedish model and actress
Yllka Berisha -  Albanian-Swedish model
Kidda -  Albanian-Swedish rapper and songwriter
Elai -  Swedish-Albanian rapper, singer and songwriter
Erjona Ala -  Fashion Model

Science and Academia
Savo Gjirja -  Albanian research engineer

Sports
Riza Durmisi -  Danish professional footballer
Kosovare Asllani -  Swedish professional footballer
Astrit Ajdarević -  Swedish professional footballer
Arbër Zeneli -  Professional footballer who plays as a midfielder for French club Reims and the Kosovo national team 
Egzon Binaku -  Albanian professional footballer 
Alfred Ajdarević - Albanian professional footballer  
Emir Bajrami -  Swedish professional footballer
Emre Mor -  Danish-Turkish footballer
Ilir Latifi -   Swedish mixed martial artist
Robert Gojani -  Swedish professional footballer
Labinot Harbuzi -  Swedish professional footballer
Bashkim Kadrii -  Danish footballer
Valon Berisha - Kosovar footballer 
Zymer Bytyqi - Norwegian footballer who plays as a winger for Viking 
Bersant Celina - professional footballer who plays as a midfielder for Welsh club Swansea City
Flamur Kastrati - Kosovar footballer who plays as a forward for Eliteserien club Kristiansund
Kamer Qaka -  Albanian professional footballer
Herolind Shala - professional footballer who plays as a midfielder for Norwegian club Start
Bajram Ajeti - Norwegian footballer 
Fitim Azemi - Norwegian footballer
Arian Kabashi -  Swedish football player
Albion Ademi -  Finnish footballer 
Erton Fejzullahu -  Swedish-Kosovar footballer  
Gentrit Citaku -  Swedish professional footballer 
Petrit Zhubi -  Swedish footballer
Berat Sadik -   Finnish footballer
Irfan Sadik -   Finnish footballer
Mentor Zhubi -   Swedish International Futsal player
Denis Abdulahi -  professional football player from Finland
Erfan Zeneli -   Finnish footballer
Edis Tatli -   Finnish professional boxer
Bajram Fetai -   Swedish player
Ibrahim Drešević -   Swedish footballer
Perparim Hetemaj -   Finnish professional footballer
Mehmet Hetemaj -   Finnish professional footballer
Njazi Kuqi -   Finnish footballer
Shefki Kuqi -   Finnish footballer
Richard Yarsuvat -   Swedish International Futsal player
Naim Terbunja -   Swedish professional boxer
Loret Sadiku -   Kosovar Professional footballer 
Besard Sabovic -   Swedish footballer
Drilon Shala -  Finnish football player
Dardan Rexhepi -   Kosovar footballer
Armend Kabashi -   Finnish professional football midfielder
Leonard Pllana -   Kosovo Albanian professional footballer
Agon Mehmeti -   Albanian professional footballer
Lum Rexhepi -   Finnish-Kosovar professional footballer
Shkodran Maholli -   Swedish footballer
Valmir Seferi -  Finnish football player
Kujtime Kurbogaj -    Albanian football midfielder
Fitim Kastrati -  Norwegian football midfielder
Xhevdet Gela -  Finnish football player
Nooralotta Neziri -   Finnish 100 meter hurdler
Tani Stafsula -   Finnish football player
Dafina Memedov -  Swedish Albanian football midfielder
Bardhec Bytyqi -  Danish footballer
Bashkim Ajdini -   German-Swedish professional footballer
Ylldren Ibrahimaj -   Norwegian footballer
Elbasan Rashani -   Norwegian footballer

References

Scandinavia
Albanian diaspora
Albanian
Albanian diaspora in Norway
Albanian